Winchester Lake (also known as Lapwai Lake) is a man-made body of water located on the south side of Winchester in Lewis County, Idaho. It is the central feature of Winchester Lake State Park.

History
The lake was created in 1910, when the Craig Mountain Lumber Company placed a dam at the headwaters of Lapwai Creek forming a mill pond that was used until the early 1960s by which time the area's marketable timber had all been felled. The lumber mill was the largest of its kind in northern Idaho, employing as many as 270 workers. The mill pond was also a source of electric power for the town. The lake was purchased from Potlatch Forests in 1966 by the Idaho Department of Fish and Game, which then turned over the lake and surrounding land to the Idaho Department of Parks and Recreation in 1969 for development of the state park.

Fishery
After its acquisition by the Department of Fish and Game, the lake was drained and cleaned of logs and mill debris. It has at least once subsequently been chemically rehabilitated to remove undesirable species. Game fish found in Winchester Lake include rainbow trout, bluegill, tiger muskie, yellow perch, and largemouth bass.

References

See also

 List of lakes in Idaho

External links
Winchester Lake Idaho Department of Fish and Game

Lakes of Idaho
Lakes of Lewis County, Idaho